Miklós (Nicolae) Bródy (30 March 1877, in Nagykároly, Kingdom of Hungary, Austria-Hungary, now Carei, Romania – 17 December 1949, in Cluj-Napoca, Romania) was a Hungarian–Romanian chess master.

In 1897, he tied for 4-5th in Berlin (Ignatz von Popiel won). In 1897, he tied for 3rd-4th in Vienna  (Georg Marco won). In 1899, he took 3rd in Budapest (Géza Maróczy won). In 1899, he tied for 2nd-3rd with Carl Schlechter, behind Géza Maróczy, in Vienna (Kolisch Memorial). He took 13th in the Paris 1900 chess tournament (Emanuel Lasker won). 

In 1902, he took 8th in Hanover (13 DSB-Kongress, B tourn., Walter John won). In 1906, he took 3rd in Győr (1st HUN-ch, Zoltán von Balla won). In 1908, he tied for 6-7th in Düsseldorf (16 DSB-Kongress, Frank Marshall won). In 1909, he tied for 2nd-4th, behind Zsigmond Barász, in Budapest. In 1911, he tied for 3rd-5th in Budapest (HUN-ch, Balla and Barasz won). In 1913, he tied for 6-7th in Budapest (Rudolf Spielmann won).

After World War I, he became a Romanian citizen as a result of the post-war border changes in 1920. Brody took 6th at Budapest in 1921 (Savielly Tartakower and Szávay won). In 1927, he took 2nd, behind Alexandru Tyroler, in Bucharest (2nd ROM-ch).

He played for Romania in Chess Olympiads: 
 In 1926, at second board in 2nd unofficial Chess Olympiad in Budapest;
 In 1928, at first board in 2nd Chess Olympiad in The Hague (+4 –8 =4);
 In 1935, at third board in 6th Chess Olympiad in Warsaw (+5 –3 =7).
He won team bronze medal at Budapest 1926.

References

External links

1877 births
1949 deaths
Hungarian chess players
Romanian chess players
Chess Olympiad competitors
People from Carei